Breathless is a British television period drama originally broadcast on ITV. It was created by Paul Unwin and Peter Grimsdale and directed by Paul Unwin, Marek Losey and Philippa Langdale, it stars Jack Davenport and Catherine Steadman. The setting is early 1960s England. This show was produced by ITV Studios and Masterpiece. On 29 January 2014, it was confirmed that Breathless would not be returning for a second series.

Summary 
The plot concerns some of the hospital staff that secretly perform off-site abortions (illegal at the time), their lives, and the complications that ensue.  However, various subplots quickly rise to the surface while at a third level, personal relationships explore the roles of each of the characters in the society and social mores within the context of tremendous changes occurring in Britain. The focus remains on London in 1961 and the emerging contrasts within society.

References

External links

2013 British television series debuts
2013 British television series endings
2010s British drama television series
2010s British medical television series
ITV television dramas
2010s British television miniseries
Television series by ITV Studios
Television series set in the 1960s
English-language television shows